Dabney is an unincorporated community in Logan County, West Virginia, United States. It was also known as Kleenkoal.

References

Unincorporated communities in Logan County, West Virginia
Unincorporated communities in West Virginia
Coal towns in West Virginia